Victor Kros (born 11 September 1981) is a Dutch former football goalkeeper. He made his debut in Dutch professional football on 20 January 2002 for Sparta Rotterdam, replacing Frank Kooiman in a game against AZ Alkmaar.

References
Kros on Ronald Zwiers
VI Profile

Living people
1981 births
Dutch footballers
Association football goalkeepers
Sparta Rotterdam players
Eredivisie players
Eerste Divisie players
Footballers from Rotterdam